Vytautas Šlapikas (born 30 April 1973) is a Lithuanian chess player who holds the title of International Master (IM, 1999). He is winner of Lithuanian Chess Championship (1996).

Biography 
In 1996 Vytautas Šlapikas won Lithuanian Chess Championship where he shared 1st-2nd places with Virginijus Dambrauskas and ahead of him in additional indicators. In 2000 he participated in a large division of 1st place in the Lithuanian Chess Championship but according to additional indicators, he was left without a medal.

In 2000 Vytautas Šlapikas participated in FIDE World Chess Championship Baltic country Zonal tournament.

Vytautas Šlapikas played for Lithaunia in the Chess Olympiads:
 In 2000, at fourth board in the 34th Chess Olympiad in Istanbul (+5, =2, -3).

In 1999 he was awarded the FIDE International Master (IM) title.

Since begin 2000s, Vytautas Šlapikas has been active participated in correspondence chess tournaments. He won bronze medal in Lithuanian Correspondence Chess Championship (2002—2004).

Vytautas Šlapikas is graduate of the Aleksandras Stulginskis University (ASU) (now Vytautas Magnus University Agriculture Academy) majoring in agricultural economics. He worked at the Municipal Bureau of Culture and Education in Kaunas. Later he worked as a chess coach and insurance consultant in the company Lietuvos draudimas.

Vytautas Šlapikas had mental disorder. In 2013, he officially quit his last job. On January 13, 2014, being in an insane state, Vytautas Šlapikas killed his wife Asta Šlapikene. By the decision of Vilnius Regional Court he placed on compulsory treatment in psychiatric hospital in Rokiškis.

References

External links 

1973 births
Living people
Chess International Masters
Lithuanian chess players
People from Ukmergė